The following railroads operate in Idaho.

Common freight carriers
Canadian Pacific Railway (CPR)
City of Boise Railroad (COB)
BG&CM Railroad (BGCM)
BNSF Railway (BNSF)
Boise Valley Railroad (BVRR)
Eastern Idaho Railroad (EIRR)
Frontier Rail (FTRX)
Great Northwest Railroad (GRNW)
Idaho and Sedalia Transportation Company (ISR)
Idaho Northern and Pacific Railroad (INPR)
Montana Rail Link (MRL)
Pend Oreille Valley Railroad (POVA)
St. Maries River Railroad (STMA)
Union Pacific Railroad (UP)
Washington and Idaho Railway (WIR)

Passenger carriers

Amtrak (AMTK)
Silverwood Theme Park Steam Train
Thunder Mountain Line

Private

Idaho National Laboratory

Defunct railroads

Electric
Inland Empire Railroad
Spokane, Coeur d'Alene and Palouse Railway
Spokane and Eastern Railway and Power Company
Spokane and Inland Empire Railroad

Notes

References
Association of American Railroads (2003), . Retrieved May 9, 2005.

Idaho railroads
 
 
Railroads